Zygier is a surname. Notable people with the surname include:

Ben Zygier (1976–2010), Australian-Israeli prisoner
Willy Zygier, musician and husband of the Australian singer Deborah Conway